Scaphiophryne menabensis is a species of frog in the family Microhylidae.
It is endemic to Madagascar.
Its natural habitats are subtropical or tropical dry forests and intermittent freshwater marshes.
It is threatened by habitat loss.

References

Scaphiophryne
Endemic frogs of Madagascar
Taxonomy articles created by Polbot
Amphibians described in 2005